Events from the year 2003 in Macau, China.

Incumbents
 Chief Executive - Edmund Ho
 President of the Legislative Assembly - Susana Chou

Events

March
 21 March - The opening of Heritage Exhibition of a Traditional Pawnshop Business in Sé.
 28 March - The inauguration of Macau Olympic Aquatic Centre in Taipa.

April
 8 April - The inauguration of Coloane B Power Station in Coloane.

References

 
Years of the 21st century in Macau
Macau
Macau
2000s in Macau